Deutscher is a German surname. Notable people with the surname include:
Alma Deutscher, British musician and composer
Drafi Deutscher, German singer and composer
Guy Deutscher (linguist)
Guy Deutscher (physicist)
Isaac Deutscher, British journalist, historian and political activist
Tamara Deutscher, British writer and editor

Fictional characters
 Deutscher, a character in the short story "A Sound of Thunder" by Ray Bradbury

See also
Deucher, Ohio
Deutsch (disambiguation)
German (disambiguation)

German-language surnames
Jewish surnames